Tohme or Tohmé is an Arabic surname. Notable people with the surname include:

 Bassam Tohme (born 1969), Syrian politician
 Christine Tohmé (born 1964), Lebanese curator

See also
 Toome (surname)
 Toom (surname)

Arabic-language surnames